The women's competition in 58 kg division was staged on September 21–22, 2007.

Schedule

Medalists

Records

Results

References
Results 

Women's 58
World